Chorotypus is a genus of Asian grasshoppers in the family Chorotypidae; species can be found in: India, Indo-China and Malesia.

Species
The Catalogue of Life lists:
Chorotypus ameliae Bolívar, 1930 — northern Borneo
Chorotypus biemarginatus Brunner von Wattenwyl, 1898 — Java
Chorotypus brunneri Kirby, 1910 — northern Borneo
Chorotypus fenestratus Serville, 1838 - type species — India
Chorotypus haani Brunner von Wattenwyl, 1898 — southern Kalimantan
Chorotypus pusillus Brunner von Wattenwyl, 1898 — Java
Chorotypus saussurei Bolívar, 1930 — Peninsular Malaysia (Perak)
Chorotypus servillei Bolívar, 1930 — northern Borneo
Chorotypus vietnamensis Storozhenko, 2017 — Vietnam

References

External links

Chorotypidae
Caelifera genera
Insects of Southeast Asia